Joaquín Arias (born September 21, 1984) is a Dominican former professional baseball infielder. He played in Major League Baseball (MLB) for the Texas Rangers, New York Mets, and San Francisco Giants.

Baseball career

New York Yankees
Arias signed with the New York Yankees as an international free agent in 2001. He batted .266 for the Battle Creek Yankees of the Class A Midwest League in 2003.

Texas Rangers
The Texas Rangers acquired Arias on March 23, 2004, completing a trade made 36 days earlier on February 16 that sent Alex Rodriguez to the New York Yankees for Alfonso Soriano. Among five Yankees prospects offered to the Rangers, Arias was selected over Robinson Canó because he was a more polished defender and two years younger. Arias made his Major League debut with the Rangers on September 13, 2006, drawing a walk against the Detroit Tigers.

New York Mets
Arias was designated for assignment on August 24, 2010 and traded to the New York Mets on August 31 for Jeff Francoeur.

Kansas City Royals
On November 4, 2010, Arias was claimed off waivers by the Kansas City Royals, but the Royals designated Arias for assignment on December 19 to make room on the 40-man roster for the prospects acquired in the Zack Greinke trade.

San Francisco Giants
The San Francisco Giants signed Arias to a minor league contract on December 15, 2011. After spending the 2012 Spring training with the Giants, he was assigned to Fresno Grizzlies, Giants' Triple-A affiliate, on April 5. He played 18 games for the Grizzlies, hitting .400 with 2 home runs and 17 runs batted in (RBIs). The Giants called up Arias on April 25.

2012
Arias hit his first major-league home run in his 331st career major-league at-bat on May 22, 2012. The two-run homer off Milwaukee Brewers starting pitcher Shaun Marcum gave San Francisco a 4–0 lead in the 4th inning of a game the Giants would go on to win by a score of 6–4. On June 13, 2012, playing third base, Arias fielded a tricky grounder—stumbling backwards as he gloved the ball—and threw to first base for the final out of Matt Cain's perfect game. On August 22, 2012, he accumulated a single-game career high of five RBIs. In total, Arias appeared in 112 games of the 2012 regular season, batting .270 with 5 home runs and 34 RBIs. He was also hit by pitches a team-high 5 times.

The Giants finished the 2012 season as World Series Champions. During the postseason Arias appeared in 12 games, all of them as a mid- to late-inning replacement. On October 10, during the Division Series against the Cincinnati Reds, Arias entered the game in the fourth inning and had two hits in three times at bat. Both hits were doubles, after both of which Arias eventually scored runs in a game the Giants won 8–3. Overall for the postseason, Arias went 3-for-8 (.375) with three runs scored.

2013
On June 24, 2013, Arias left a game against the Los Angeles Dodgers in the second inning with a left hamstring injury after scoring from first base on a double by Andrés Torres. The injury only sidelined Arias for a little over a week and he took the field for the Giants against the Cincinnati Reds on July 3. However, his return proved to be short-lived when he required an emergency appendectomy late on the night of July 7. The following day the Giants placed him on the 15-day disabled list. He was re-activated and returned to the team on July 26.  Arias started 47 games, appeared in 102 games, batting .271 with 19 RBIs.

2014
On January 23, 2014, Arias and the Giants agreed on a two-year, $2.6-million contract. Arias appeared in 107 games, batting .254 with 15 RBIs.  In the 2014 postseason, Arias appeared in 8 games, batting 2-for-4 with one RBI and two runs scored, as the Giants won the 2014 World Series over the Kansas City Royals.

2015
On April 28, 2015, Arias hit 3-for-3 off Clayton Kershaw, becoming the first Giant get three hits off Kershaw in one game. Arias appeared in 40 games, batting .207, before being designated for assignment on July 27.  Árias cleared waivers and was assigned to the Triple-A Sacramento River Cats.

Arizona Diamondbacks
On December 13, 2015, Arias signed a minor league deal with the Arizona Diamondbacks. He was released on March 31, 2016.

References

External links

1984 births
Living people
Águilas Cibaeñas players
Arizona League Rangers players
Battle Creek Yankees players
Dominican Republic expatriate baseball players in the United States
Estrellas Orientales players
Fresno Grizzlies players
Frisco RoughRiders players
Gulf Coast Yankees players
Major League Baseball players from the Dominican Republic
Major League Baseball second basemen
Major League Baseball shortstops
New York Mets players
Oklahoma City RedHawks players
Oklahoma RedHawks players
Omaha Storm Chasers players
Sacramento River Cats players
San Francisco Giants players
Sportspeople from Santo Domingo
Stockton Ports players
Texas Rangers players